Light Industry and Science Park (LISP) is the name of a series of industrial parks in the Philippines owned and developed by Science Park of the Philippines. It has six locations, namely: LISP I in Cabuyao,  Laguna, LISP II in Calamba, Laguna, LISP III in Santo Tomas, Batangas, LISP IV in Malvar, Batangas, Cebu Light Industrial Park (CLIP) in Lapu-Lapu City, and Hermosa Ecozone Industrial Park (HEIP) in Hermosa, Bataan.

LISP II, which is located in Barangay Real, Calamba, Laguna, sold out after two years.

References 

Buildings and structures in Calamba, Laguna
Industrial parks in the Philippines
Science parks in the Philippines